Citizen is the debut full-length album by Army of Me. Its first single is "Going Through Changes", which appears on Burnout Dominator, Burnout Paradise, and MLB 06: The Show. The song "Better Run" is featured in ABC Family's Kyle XY in the episode "Primary Colors" originally aired on February 25, 2008.

Track listing
All tracks written by Army of Me.
 "Perfect" – 4:35
 "Going Through Changes" – 4:06
 "Rise" – 3:55
 "Meet You at the Mouth" – 4:11
 "Still Believe in You" – 4:16
 "Thinking It Over" – 3:47
 "Better Run" – 4:20
 "How Long" – 3:36
 "Walking On" – 4:32
 "2 into 1" – 4:06
 "Saved Your Life" – 3:43
 "Back to Business" – 4:04

Personnel
John Hutchins - bass
Tripper Ryder - bass
Dennis Manuel - drums
Brad Tursi - guitar, vocals
Vince Scheuerman - guitar, piano, vocals

2007 albums
Army of Me (band) albums
Albums produced by Michael Baskette
Doghouse Records albums